Philippe Adams (born 19 November 1969 in Mouscron, Belgium) is a racing driver.

Career

Early career 
Adams first began in motorsport at the age of twelve, racing karts, before beginning in car racing in 1984. In 1992, Adams competed in the British Formula 3 Championship, finishing second overall in the season. Adams went on to the British Formula Two Series for 1993, winning the championship.

Formula One (1994) 

Adams and his backers agreed with Team Lotus to find $500,000 to earn a pay-drive with them for two rounds of the 1994 Formula One season. Part of the funding for this came from an insurance policy taken out against his Belgian Procar race at Spa alongside the F1 race, which he won. He retired from the Belgian round, but managed to finish 16th in the Portuguese round. In between these two races, regular driver Alessandro Zanardi qualified a strong 13th for his home race. Adams was also intended to race at Jerez, but the team gave the drive back to Zanardi.

After Formula One 
Adams never returned to Formula One opting to return to the national scene, primarily in production car and sportscar racing.

Racing record

Complete Japanese Formula 3000 results
(key) (Races in bold indicate pole position) (Races in italics indicate fastest lap)

Complete Formula One results
(key)

Complete Super Tourenwagen Cup results
(key) (Races in bold indicate pole position) (Races in italics indicate fastest lap)

References

External links 
Profile on F1 Rejects

1969 births
Living people
People from Mouscron
Belgian Formula One drivers
Team Lotus Formula One drivers
Belgian racing drivers
British Formula Three Championship drivers
British Formula 3000 Championship drivers
Japanese Formula 3000 Championship drivers
Sportspeople from Hainaut (province)

Alan Docking Racing drivers
20th-century Belgian people